Roman Sakin (born March 17, 1976) is a Russian sculptor. He lives and works in Moscow.

Biography 
Sakin was born on 17 March 1976 in Kursk, Russia. Having graduated from V.M.Vasnetsov Art and Industry College in 1997, he graduated from the Department of Monumental-Decorative Sculpture at Stroganov Moscow State University of Arts and Industry in 2005.  In 2009 he was nominated for the Kandinsky Prize in "Media Art Project of the Year" with project "Les". In 2012 he was nominated for the Kandinsky Prize in "Media Art Project of the Year" with project "Master 3-go razryada".

Selected collections 
 ART4.RU Contemporary Art Museum, Moscow
 Spazio Carbonesi, Bologna
 Moscow Museum of Modern Art

Solo exhibitions 
 2007 — «K.B.-1». Art Strelka Gallery, Moscow.
 2008 — «Les». Moscow Museum of Modern Art, Moscow.
 2011 — «Master 3-go razryada». Marat Guelman Gallery, Moscow.
 2014 — «School Of Athens». Pechersky Gallery, Moscow.

Group exhibitions 
 2005 — 2007 — «Masterskaja». Moscow Museum of Modern Art, Moscow.
 2008 — «Opyt 1». LABORATORIA Art&Science Space, Moscow.
 2009 — «Kandinsky Prize». Central House of Artists, Moscow.
 2009 — «Cliche». Moscow Museum of Modern Art, Moscow.
 2009 — «10 years of the Moscow Museum of Modern Art. 1989-2009 Russian art from the museum's collection». Moscow Museum of Modern Art, Moscow.
 2010 — «Erased Walls». ZAMEK, Poznań. Freies Museum Berlin, Berlin. SPACE, Bratislava.
 2010 — «New Formalism». City Sculpture Museum, Saint Petersburg.
 2011 — «Imperfetto». Spazio Carbonesi, Bologna.
 2011 — «Freedom». Spazio Carbonesi, Bologna.
 2011 — «Nuzhnoe Iskusstvo». Gorky Central Park of Culture and Leisure, Moscow.
 2012 — «Pyl». LABORATORIA Art&Science Space, Moscow.
 2012 — «Kandinsky Prize».  “Udarnik” cinema, Moscow.

References

External links 
 
 

21st-century Russian sculptors
20th-century Russian sculptors
20th-century Russian male artists
Russian male sculptors
1976 births
Living people
Kandinsky Prize
21st-century Russian male artists
Stroganov Moscow State Academy of Arts and Industry alumni